Shia Islam in Egypt is composed of the highly persecuted low profile Shia Muslim community of Egypt.

History and culture
Shia Islam has a long pedigree in Egypt. The Shia Fatimids came to power in 969 AD in Egypt; they established a new capital called Cairo as the seat of the  Fatimid dynasty. Fatimids ruled Egypt for 200 years (969 -1171) and shaped its identity. They also established the famous al-Azhar University in 970 AD in Cairo as a university, founded in order to spread knowledge throughout the world; the university exists to this day and is one of the oldest universities in the world. Al-Azhar was originally a Shia university. However, it is generally accepted that before, during and after the Fatimid rule in Egypt, the people of Egypt were and continued to remain predominantly Sunni, with Ismailism being followed by the ruling classes, rather than the general populace.

Even today, Egypt remains a country with strong Shia ties. Egyptian Sunnis especially followers of Sufi denominations visit revered Shia shrines and mosques dedicated to Hussein, Hasan, Zainab, Ali, and other Shia Imams, and unwittingly incorporate Shia practices into their traditions and funerary rites. The number of Shia in Egypt is growing, and there have been several cases of Sunnis converting to Shiism.

Following are few Egyptian Shia organizations:
 'Congregation of Ahl Al-Bayt' ('the family of Prophet Mohamed') headed by Mohamed El-Derini.
 'Shia Current in Egypt' headed by Mohamed Ghoneim

Population estimates

While Shia activists claim the number exceeds one million, the Salafists say there are only a few thousand. According to The Economist, estimates range from 50,000 to one million. Minority Rights Group International estimates Egyptian Shia population to range from 800,000 to two million out of Egypt’s total population of about 90 million.

Persecution
According to Brian Whitaker, in Egypt, the small Shia population is harassed by the authorities and treated with suspicion, being arrested - ostensibly for security reasons - but then being subjected to torrents of abuse by state security officers for their religious beliefs. For decades, international organisations – including the UN, Human Rights Watch and Amnesty International – have documented instances in which Egyptian Shias have been targeted for their religious beliefs. A December 2012 report by UN refugee agency UNHCR highlighted the fact that Shias still cannot openly practice their religious rituals in Egypt. Hassiba Hadj Sahraoui told the UNHCR that many groups were being prosecuted for alleged 'blasphemy.' US Commission on International Religious Freedom continues to label Egypt as a "country of particular concern" in terms of systematic violations of religious freedom.
In December 2011, Egyptian security forces prevented hundreds of Shias from observing Ashura religious celebrations in Cairo's El-Hussein Mosque, a Shia holy site. Police forcibly removed the Shia worshippers from the mosque after Salafi groups accused them of performing barbaric rituals.

In May 2012, Al-Azhar Grand Imam Ahmed El-Tayeb chaired a meeting with Islamist forces – including scholars, Muslim Brotherhood members and Salafists – at which they declared their total rejection of "attempts to spread Shiism in Egypt."

On 23 June 2013, after months of Salafi propaganda in the area, several hundred Sunni Muslims surrounded the house of Shia cleric Hasan Shahhata (an ex-Sunni) in the village of Abu Mussalam in Giza Province. The mob killed the cleric along with three of his followers, then dragged their bodies in the streets. The police did nothing to stop the attack. Amnesty's Deputy Director of Middle East Programs Hassiba Hadj Sahraoui said on 25 June 2013, "The Egyptian authorities must immediately order an independent and impartial investigation into the killing of the four men, and send a clear message that carrying out attacks and inciting violence against Shiite Muslims will not be tolerated."

As of 2017, the NGOs still report that violence and propaganda against the Shia minority continues. Shia Muslims are frequently denied services in addition to being called derogatory names. Anti-Shia sentiment is spread through education at all levels. Clerics educated at Al-Azhar University publicly promote sectarian beliefs by calling Shia Muslims infidels and encourage isolation and marginalization of Shia Muslims in Egypt.

References

External links